Ivan Huml (born September 6, 1981) is a Czech professional ice hockey player. He currently plays for Piráti Chomutov in the Czech fourth league. Huml was selected by the Boston Bruins in the 2nd round (59th overall) of the 2000 NHL Entry Draft and went on to play 49 regular season games for the Bruins, scoring 6 goals and 12 assists for 18 points and collecting 36 penalty minutes over three seasons between 2001 and 2004. The rest of his career has mainly been spent in Europe.

Playing career
Huml spent much of his tenure with their American Hockey League affiliate the Providence Bruins. In 2004, Huml began playing in the Czech Extraliga with HC Rabat Kladno his hometown team. He then moved to Finland's SM-liiga with TPS before playing with Mora IK in Sweden's Elitserien until 2008 when he moved to back to his home country for the 2008-2009 season to play for the HC Mountfield. In the middle of the 2009-2010 season, Mountfield rented him to the HC Kometa Brno. He was fully transferred to HC Kometa Brno for the season 2010-2011, until in the January 2011 the team rented him to the SM-Liiga team Oulun Kärpät for the rest of the season. He quickly rose to be the team's first center and made a deal with Kärpät for the season 2011-2012. Huml made a two-year deal with Kärpät in January 2012. Huml ended up staying with Kärpät until the end of the 2015-2016 season, after which he left the team having won two Finnish championships followed up by an emotional bronze medal win in his last game with the team.

Career statistics

Regular season and playoffs

International

External links
 

1981 births
Living people
Boston Bruins draft picks
Boston Bruins players
Czech ice hockey centres
Langley Hornets players
HC Kometa Brno players
HC TPS players
Mora IK players
Motor České Budějovice players
Oulun Kärpät players
Piráti Chomutov players
Providence Bruins players
Rytíři Kladno players
Sportspeople from Kladno
Czech expatriate ice hockey players in Canada
Czech expatriate ice hockey players in the United States
Czech expatriate ice hockey players in Finland
Czech expatriate ice hockey players in Sweden